One Night Only is a live album and DVD/Blu-ray by the Bee Gees. It features the group's concert at the MGM Grand in Las Vegas in 1997 and includes many of their greatest hits.

The CD is edited, with some songs omitted, though the DVD version of the concert is complete. The album was reissued in 1999, and included a bonus CD with the missing songs. The CD and DVD cover features the band replicating their iconic Saturday Night Fever pose. The concert was re-released on SD Blu-ray by Eagle Rock Entertainment in 2013. The re-release provides superior audio quality than what is possible on DVD, but video is only marginally improved (the standard-definition video is now up-scaled to 1080i).

The Bee Gees performed songs from every decade from the 1960s to the '90s. They also sang a tribute song to their late brother Andy Gibb, "(Our Love) Don't Throw It All Away". During this song old footage of Andy is shown, including him singing the second verse of the song. The vocals from the original recording also play during that section. Céline Dion guest-starred on the Bee Gees-penned "Immortality". Recorded vocals by Frankie Valli are featured during "Grease", and are also taken from the original song.

The album's title was originally meant to reflect the band's plan that the Las Vegas concert would be their final live performance ever. Barry Gibb's arthritis in his back had worsened to the point where it seemed it would be impossible for him to continue playing. He nonetheless wanted to expand the tour, so they played several more shows, holding one every two weeks so that Barry would be able to recover from his injury.

Track listing
All songs by Barry, Robin and Maurice Gibb, except where noted.

"Intro: You Should Be Dancing/Alone" – 5:47
"Massachusetts" – 2:32
"To Love Somebody" (B. Gibb, R. Gibb) – 3:10
"Words" – 3:27
"Closer Than Close" – 3:30
"Islands in the Stream" – 3:47
"(Our Love) Don't Throw It All Away" (featuring Andy Gibb) (B. Gibb, Blue Weaver) – 3:52
"Night Fever/More Than a Woman" – 3:26
"Lonely Days" – 3:44
"New York Mining Disaster 1941" (B. Gibb, R. Gibb) – 2:15
"I Can't See Nobody" (B. Gibb, R. Gibb) – 1:30
"And the Sun Will Shine" – 1:54
"Nights on Broadway" – 1:05
"How Can You Mend a Broken Heart" (B. Gibb, R. Gibb) – 3:27
"Heartbreaker" – 1:05
"Guilty" – 2:21
"Immortality" (featuring Celine Dion) – 4:46
"Tragedy" – 4:28
"I Started a Joke" – 2:48
"Grease" (featuring Frankie Valli) (B. Gibb) – 2:43
"Jive Talkin'" – 4:19
"How Deep Is Your Love" – 3:54
"Stayin' Alive" – 3:59
"You Should Be Dancing" – 4:12

1999 reissue bonus CD
"I've Gotta Get a Message to You" – 4:08
"One" – 4:38
"Still Waters (Run Deep)" – 3:26
"Morning of My Life (In the Morning)" (B. Gibb) – 3:10
"Too Much Heaven" – 1:58
"Run to Me" – 1:19

DVD/Blu-ray
"You Should Be Dancing"
"Alone"
"Massachusetts"
"To Love Somebody"
"I've Gotta Get a Message to You"
"Words" 
"Closer Than Close"
"Islands in the Stream"
"One"
"Our Love (Don't Throw It All Away)"
"Night Fever"
"More Than a Woman"
"Still Waters (Run Deep)"
"Lonely Days"
"Morning of My Life (In the Morning)"
"New York Mining Disaster 1941"
"Too Much Heaven"
"I Can't See Nobody"
"Run to Me"
"And the Sun Will Shine"
"Nights on Broadway"
"How Can You Mend a Broken Heart"
"Heartbreaker"
"Guilty"
"Immortality"
"Tragedy"
"I Started a Joke"
"Grease"
"Jive Talkin'"
"How Deep Is Your Love"
"Stayin' Alive"
"You Should Be Dancing"

Note: As the song "How Deep Is Your Love" finishes to sustained applause, Barry's daughter, Alexandra, appears on stage to present him and her uncle Robin with red roses. When she tries to give one to her other uncle, Maurice, "Stayin' Alive" starts to play, forcing her to exit.

While the song "Grease" is being performed, the lighting crew shines a spotlight on Olivia Newton-John and her daughter, Chloe Rose Lattanzi, who are sitting in the audience.

DVD video is formatted for 4:3 screens.
DVD audio tracks are in three formats:
Stereo Dolby Digital at 192 kbit/s
5.1 Surround Dolby Digital at 448 kbit/s
5.1 Surround DTS at 768 kbit/s
Blu-ray video is formatted for 16:9 screens with upscaled SD video.

Personnel
Barry Gibb - guitar, vocals
Robin Gibb - vocals
Maurice Gibb - keyboards, guitar, vocals

Additional personnel
Alan Kendall – lead guitar
Stephen Gibb – lead and rhythm guitar
Ben Stivers – keyboards
Matt Bonelli – bass guitar
Steve Rucker – drums
John Merchant – off-stage keyboards, mix engineer
Celine Dion – vocals on "Immortality"
Andy Gibb – pre-recorded vocals on "Our Love (Don't Throw It All Away)"
Frankie Valli – pre-recorded vocals on "Grease"

Charts

Weekly charts

Year-end charts

Certifications and sales

Release history

References

Bee Gees albums
1998 live albums
1998 video albums
Live video albums
PolyGram live albums
Albums recorded at the MGM Grand Las Vegas